Fällman is a Swedish surname. Notable people with the surname include:

 David Fällman (born 1990), Swedish footballer
 Johanna Fällman (born 1990), Swedish ice hockey player

Swedish-language surnames